Wolf & Bear is an American post-hardcore band from Sacramento, California. Formed in 2013, the band consists of vocalists Marcus Cisneros and Tyler Watt, guitarists Cameron Nunez and Louie Baltazar, and drummer Jacob Koval. The band originated in the Central Valley hardcore punk music scene, later signing to Blue Swan Records and releasing a split with post-hardcore band Adventurer in May 2016 and their debut studio album, Everything Is Going Grey, in October 2017.

The band released the live album, Grey Sessions, in June 2018, which was followed by a four-track self-titled EP in August 2019. In 2020, they released the singles "Monstro" and "Street Rat". The following year, Wolf & Bear also signed to Rise Records after their label Blue Swan Records became an imprint.

Career 
Wolf & Bear formed in Sacramento, California aiming to "expand on the progressive rock genre", in 2014. The band originally consisted of vocalists Sam Kohl and Tyler Watt, lead guitarist Steven Fernandes, rhythm guitarist Cameron Nunez, and bass guitarist Ben Jovi. The band released their debut song, "Oil Cup", on January 27, 2015, featuring clean vocals from Sam Kohl, now in Sea in the Sky. It was recorded at Pus Cavern Recording Studios in late 2014 with engineers Trent Hollingsworth and Nick Scott.

2015 brought a line-up change following the departure of Sam Kohl, Steven Fernandes, and Ben Jovi. They were subsequently replaced by vocalist Marcus Cisneros, guitarist Louie Baltazar, and bass guitarist Nathaniel Duarte. They released their second single, "Sight", on September 8, 2015.

On January 6, 2016, they signed to Will Swan's record label Blue Swan Records. On March 29, 2016, the band released their single, "Different Fires", on the label. They released Wolf & Bear x Adventurer, a split EP with label-mates Adventurer, on May 20, 2016.

The band appeared on American post-hardcore band Dance Gavin Dance's 10-year anniversary tour in the United States in December 2015, alongside Strawberry Girls, Slaves, A Lot Like Birds, and Dayshell.

On June 8, 2017, they released the single "GreyBlood", their first with bass guitarist Tim Feerick, along with its music video, which premiered on Alternative Press. On September 10, 2017, it was confirmed by Blue Swan Records that Wolf & Bear was scheduled to release their debut studio album, Everything Is Going Grey, on October 3, 2017.

On June 5, 2018, the band released a five-track live album, Grey Sessions, recorded at Pus Cavern in Sacramento, California. From January 11 to 19, 2019, they toured in support of Sianvar's 2019. On February 28, 2019, they released the lead single, "Deleto", along with its music video, from an upcoming EP, and the second and third singles, "Red Hen" and "Lifeguard", on June 4, and July 18, 2019, respectively. The group's self-titled EP followed on August 14, 2019, becoming their first release since being dropped by Blue Swan.

Wolf & Bear released two singles, "Street Rat" and "Monstro", each in April 2020. In December 2020, due to the ongoing COVID-19 pandemic and its effect on the music industry, the band broadcast the Pus Cavern Streaming Event, a live-stream concert broadcast. In February 2021, it was announced that the band's record label Blue Swan Records had become an imprint of the Portland, Oregon based label Rise Records, meaning Wolf & Bear, along with Royal Coda and Eidola, had signed with the label.

On March 24, 2022, Dance Gavin Dance released the single "Synergy" that features additional guitar parts from Louie Baltazar. On April 14, 2022, it was announced by Dance Gavin Dance that Wolf & Bear bass player Tim Feerick had died.

Band members
Current
 Cameron Nunez – guitar (2013–present)
 Marcus Cisneros – clean vocals (2014–present)
 Tyler Watt – unclean vocals (2014–present)
 Louie Baltazar – guitar (2014–2016, 2020–present)
 Jacob Koval – drums (2014–present)

Past
 Sam Kohl – clean vocals (2014–2015)
 Chad Stephens – drums (2013–2014)
 Nathaniel Duarte – bass guitar (2014–16)
 Joshua Unitt – rhythm guitar (2016–2019)
 Isaac Wilson – clean vocals (2013)
 Ben Schlotthauer – bass (2013–2014)
 Tim Feerick – bass guitar (2016–2022; died 2022)

Discography
Studio albums
 Everything Is Going Grey (Blue Swan Records, 2017)

Extended plays
 Wolf & Bear x Adventurer Split (Blue Swan Records, 2016)
 Grey Sessions (Blue Swan Records, 2018)
 EP (2019)

Singles
 "Oil Cup" (2015)
 "Sight" (2015)
 "Different Fires" (2016)
 "Deleto" (2019)
 "Red Hen" (2019) 
 "Lifeguard" (2019)
 "Street Rat" (2020)
 "Monstro" (2020)

References

Musical groups established in 2014
Post-hardcore groups
Rock music groups from California
Musical groups from Sacramento, California
2014 establishments in California